Philippa Dunne is an Irish actress and writer. She is known for co-writing and starring in the RTÉ comedy The Walshes, as well as her roles as Anne Flynn in Motherland, Geraldine Devlin in Derry Girls and Ria in This Is Going to Hurt.

Life and career
Dunne was born in County Mayo, Ireland. She trained at the Gaiety School of Acting before beginning her professional career in 2009. She made her acting and writing debut in the television film Dublin Stories and appeared in two episodes of Rental Boys. In 2010, she co-wrote and appeared in The Taste of Home. In 2014, she wrote and starred in the RTÉ One comedy The Walshes as Carmel Walsh.

From 2016 to 2021, Dunne portrayed Anne Flynn in the BBC Two comedy Motherland, appearing in all 19 episodes. In 2019, she began appearing in the Channel 4 sitcom Derry Girls as Geraldine Devlin, the mother of established character Clare Devlin. Dunne appeared in the series on a recurring basis until its end in May 2022. Dunne was then cast in the BBC One medical comedy-drama series This Is Going to Hurt as Ria, the receptionist. The series began airing on 8 February 2022. She also appeared as a contestant on Celebrity Mastermind, with her specialist subject being the 1980 Stanley Kubrick film The Shining.

Filmography

References

External links
 

21st-century Irish actresses
Irish television actresses
Irish television writers
Living people
People from County Mayo
Year of birth missing (living people)